Elections to Colchester Borough Council took place on 4 May 1995. These were held on the same day as other local elections across the United Kingdom.

Summary

Ward results

Berechurch

Boxted & Langham

Castle

Great & Little Horkesley

Great Tey

Harbour

No Green candidate as previous (2.5%).

Lexden

Mile End

New Town

Prettygate

No Green candidate as previous (1.5%).

Shrub End

St. Andrew's

No Green candidate as previous (2.3%).

St. Anne's

St. John's

St. Mary's

No Green (2.2%) or Independent (10.2%) candidates as previous.

Stanway

Tiptree

West Bergholt & Eight Ash Green

West Mersea

Wivenhoe

References

1995
1995 English local elections
1990s in Essex